Luca Bisogno (born 18 June 2000) is an Italian professional footballer who plays as a goalkeeper for  club Viterbese.

Career
Born in Cava de' Tirreni, Bisogno started his career in local club Cavese. He was promoted to the first team in 2017–18 Serie D season. The club won the promotion to Serie C this year, and Bisogno made his professional debut on 17 February 2019 against Viterbese, as a late substitute. On 9 september 2019, he extended his contract with the club.

On 1 February 2021, he was loaned to Viterbese. In July 2021, he signed with the club.

References

External links
 
 

2000 births
Living people
People from Cava de' Tirreni
Footballers from Campania
Italian footballers
Association football goalkeepers
Serie C players
Serie D players
Cavese 1919 players
U.S. Viterbese 1908 players
Sportspeople from the Province of Salerno